(born 30 November 1993) is a Japanese male volleyball player. He is part of the Japan men's national volleyball team. On a college club level he plays for Aichi Gakuin University. He is captain of the Panasonic Panthers team, with the jersey number 10.

Personal life
It was announced on 14, April 2019 that he had gotten married in December 2018. He recently divorced in October 2021.

References

External links
 profile at FIVB.org

1993 births
Living people
Japanese men's volleyball players
Place of birth missing (living people)
Sportspeople from Aichi Prefecture
Aichi Gakuin University alumni
Asian Games medalists in volleyball
Volleyball players at the 2014 Asian Games
Medalists at the 2014 Asian Games
Asian Games silver medalists for Japan
Volleyball players at the 2020 Summer Olympics
Olympic volleyball players of Japan
Middle blockers